This article describes the Paschal candle of the Western Churches. For the Paschal triple-candle used in Eastern Orthodox and Byzantine Catholic churches see Paschal trikirion.

A Paschal candle is a large, white candle used in liturgies in Western Christianity (viz., the Roman Catholic Church, the Lutheran Churches, the Anglican Communion, and the Methodist Churches, among others). A new Paschal candle is blessed and lit every year at Easter, and is used throughout the Paschal season which is during Easter and then throughout the year on special occasions, such as baptisms and funerals.

The equivalent of the Paschal candle in the Western Orthodox Church is the Paschal trikirion, which differs in both style and usage.

Etymology
The term Paschal comes from the Latin word Pascha, which came from the Hebrew word Pesach, which in Hebrew means 'Passover', and relates to the Paschal mystery of salvation. It is sometimes referred to as the "Easter candle" or the "Christ candle."

Description  

For congregations that use a Paschal candle, it is the largest candle in the worship space. In most cases today the candle will display several common symbols:
 The cross, which is the most prominent symbol and most clearly identifies it as the Paschal candle
 The Greek letters alpha and omega, which symbolize that God is the beginning and the end (from the Book of Revelation)
 The year when the particular candle is being used, which represents God amidst the present congregation
 Five grains of incense (most often red), which are embedded in the candle (sometimes encased in wax "nails") during the Easter Vigil to represent the five wounds of Jesus: the three nails that pierced his hands and feet, the spear thrust into his side, and the thorns that crowned his head.

In the [medieval] Church, Paschal candles often reached a stupendous size.

Usage

Easter Vigil 
For churches that celebrate the Easter Vigil on the night of Holy Saturday, the ceremonial lighting of the Paschal candle is one of the most solemn moments of the service. The Easter Vigil liturgies of the Roman Catholic, Lutheran, Anglican, Methodist and Presbyterian Churches are nearly identical.

On Maundy Thursday of the same week the entire church is darkened by extinguishing all candles and lamps. This represents the darkness of a world without God. 

At the opening of the Easter Vigil a "new fire" is lit and blessed. The minister will trace the symbols (mentioned above) on the Paschal candle, saying words similar to: "Christ, yesterday and today, the beginning and the end, the Alpha and Omega. To Him belongs all time and all the ages; all glory and dominion is his now and forever. Amen." They then insert five grains of incense (reminiscent of the nails used to fasten Christ on the Cross) on the five points of the cross, saying: "By His holy and glorious wounds may Christ our Lord guard and keep us."

The Paschal candle is the first candle to be lit with a flame from this sacred fire, representing the light of Christ coming into the world. This represents the risen Christ, as a symbol of light (life) dispelling darkness (death). As it is lit, the minister may say words similar to: "The light of Christ, rising in Glory, dispel the darkness of our hearts and minds."

Typically, the worshiping assembly then processes into the church led by the Paschal candle. The candle is raised three times during the procession, accompanied by the chant "The light of Christ" to which the assembly responds "Thanks be to God".

In some communities, it is common for nearby churches of different Christian denominations (e.g. Catholic, Lutheran, Anglican, Methodist and Presbyterian) to make the new Easter Fire together and then after this, each congregation processes back to their own church with their own Paschal Candle for their Easter Vigil celebration; this is considered to be a fostering of ecumenism.

Following the procession the Exultet is chanted, traditionally by a deacon, but it may be chanted by the priest or a cantor. The Exultet concludes with a blessing of the candle:

Accept this Easter candle,
a flame divided but undimmed,
a pillar of fire that glows to the honor of God.
(For it is fed by the holy melting wax,
which the mother bee brought forth
to make this precious candle.)
Let it mingle with the lights of heaven
and continue bravely burning
to dispel the darkness of this night!
May the Morning Star which never sets
find this flame still burning:
Christ, that Morning Star,
who came back from the dead,
and shed his peaceful light on all humanity,
your Son, who lives and reigns for ever and ever.
Amen.

From the New Roman Missal:
On this, your night of grace, O holy Father, accept this candle, a solemn offering, the work of bees and of your servants’ hands, an evening sacrifice of praise, this gift from your most holy Church. But now we know the praises of this pillar, which glowing fire ignites for God’s honor, a fire into many flames divided, yet never dimmed by sharing of its light, for it is fed by melting wax, drawn out by mother bees to build a torch so precious. O truly blessed night, when things of heaven are wed to those of earth, and divine to the human.

Therefore, O Lord, we pray you that this candle, hallowed to the honor of your name, may persevere undimmed, to overcome the darkness of this night. Receive it as a pleasing fragrance, and let it mingle with the lights of heaven. May this flame be found still burning by the Morning Star: the one Morning Star who never sets, Christ your Son, who, coming back from death’s domain, has shed his peaceful light on humanity, and lives and reigns for ever and ever.

R. Amen.

In some traditions, the base of the candle may be ritually immersed in the baptismal font before proceeding with the remainder of the service.

This candle is traditionally the one from which all other lights are taken for the Easter service.

Other times of the year 

The candle remains lit at all worship services throughout Easter season which ends on Pentecost Sunday, (or in some traditions until Ascension Day, when it is extinguished just after the Gospel), during which time it is located in the sanctuary close to the altar. After the Easter season, it is frequently placed near the baptismal font. Before 1955, the option existed of blessing the baptismal font on the Vigil of Pentecost, and this was the only time the Paschal candle would be lit at services after Ascension.

The Paschal candle is also lit during baptisms to signify the Holy Spirit and fire that John the Baptist promised to those who were baptised in Christ. During the baptismal rite in many traditions, a small lit candle will be given to the newly baptised by a member of the community, with words similar to, "Let your light so shine before others, that they might see your good works and glorify your Father in heaven."

In the Novus Ordo, the Paschal candle is also lit and placed near the casket or urn during the funeral services such as the Mass of Repose and the Mass of Requiem. It is important to note that once lit the candle should remain burning until finished. This is to signify the hope of the resurrection into which Christians are baptised.

Eastern usage
In the Eastern Orthodox and Byzantine Catholic churches, there is no direct correspondence to the Western Paschal candle. However, throughout Bright Week, the priest carries a cross and paschal trikirion at all of the services, especially when censing, during the Little Entrance or when giving the Paschal greeting. The trikirion consists of three lit candles in a candlestick, which the priest carries in his left hand. In the Slavic tradition, the three candles may be white or different colors: green, red, blue. The deacon also carries a special Paschal candle which is a single large candle whenever he leads an ektenia (litany) or censes.

References

External links

 The Candle Carving Site
 

Catholic liturgy
Lutheran liturgy and worship
Candles